Mezyad is a settlement in Al-Ain Region in the Emirate of Abu Dhabi, the United Arab Emirates, located to the south of the main part of Al Ain City, on the border with Oman. It is known for having a historical fort, and is part of a desert park, which also includes a necropolis and Mount Hafeet nearby. The park can be called either "Mezyad Desert Park" or "Jebel Hafeet Desert Park".

History 

As a region, Al-Ain has been inhabited for over 7 millennia, as demonstrated by archeological finds. In particular, there are tombs shaped as beehives in the area of Mezyad, at the base of Jebel Hafeet, which date back to the Hafit period of the Early Bronze Age, besides In the 1950s, Sheikh Zayed, who would become the founding President of the United Arab Emirates, discovered the tombs, and brought this to the attention of a Danish team, leading to an excavation at the tombs in 1959. In 1971, Al Ain Museum was built to house items from this area. In the 2000s, the Abu Dhabi Authority for Culture & Heritage lobbied for its recognition as a World Heritage Site by UNESCO, and in 2011, Al-Ain became the first World Heritage Site in the UAE to be recognized by UNESCO.

Fort 

Mezyad Fort is a historical fort located to the east of Jebel Hafeet, and near the Hafit tombs of the Early Bronze Age, and the border crossing with Oman. Given that it is similar in appearance to the 19th century Jahili fort, it is thought to have been constructed at around the same time, during the reign of Sheikh Zayed bin Khalifa Al Nahyan.

Transport 
Mezyad lies on a route from the main part of Al-Ain to Oman, leading to Dhank, Ibri and Nizwa, and going through the Western Hajar Mountains. Named "Zayed Bin Sultan Street", it goes past Al-Ain's traditional camel market, near Bawadi Mall and an IKEA store.

See also 
 Al Buraimi Governorate
 Al-Buraimi Oasis
 Hugh Boustead

References

External links 
 In Arabic

 
Oman–United Arab Emirates border crossings